The 1983 Pro Bowl was the NFL's 33rd annual all-star game which featured the outstanding performers from the 1982 season. The game was played on Sunday, February 6, 1983, at Aloha Stadium in Honolulu, Hawaii before a crowd of 47,207. The final score was NFC 20, AFC 19.

Walt Michaels of the New York Jets led the AFC team against an NFC team coached by Dallas Cowboys head coach Tom Landry. The referee was Fred Silva.

Dan Fouts of the San Diego Chargers and John Jefferson of the Green Bay Packers were named the game's Most Valuable Players. A late touchdown pass from Danny White of the Dallas Cowboys to Jefferson provided the NFC margin of victory.

Players on the winning NFC team received $10,000 apiece while the AFC participants each took home $5,000 which were double the payouts of the previous year.

AFC roster

Offense

Defense

Special teams

NFC roster

Offense

Defense

Special teams

References

External links

Pro Bowl
Pro Bowl
Pro Bowl
Pro Bowl
Pro Bowl
American football competitions in Honolulu
February 1983 sports events in the United States